is a virtual idol fictional character in Namco's Ridge Racer series of racing video games who is its most prominent race queen and one of Namco's mascot characters. Reiko has first appeared in Rage Racer in 1996. She has gained an iconic status and an enduring high popularity among the fans of the long-running series, resulting in her being brought back by Namco after an attempt to substitute her was met with fan backlash, appearing in many other games and other creations, and the creation of a series of characters named Kei Nagase in the Ace Combat series, one of whom is her younger sister.

Appearances

In Ridge Racer games
Reiko Nagase is a fictional race queen from Tokyo who is the digital mascot and host of the Ridge Racer series. Reiko officially first appeared and was named in the racing game Rage Racer (1996), in the game's full motion video intro directed by Kei Yoshimizu from Keica, also appearing in-game. In R4: Ridge Racer Type 4 (1998), she was given more prominence, as the opening animation, which used a song by Kimara Lovelace, was a short story starring her. Type 4 also introduced a redesign to her 3D model by Kei Yoshimizu. This is when Namco started giving more exposure to the character, heavily using her image to promote the game. She also appears in the Nintendo-developed Ridge Racer 64 (2000).

In 2000, Namco decided to replace Reiko in Ridge Racer V with newcomer Ai Fukami (深水 藍). In 2001, Namco also created an "image girl" for their Namco Sports line named Hitomi Yoshino (吉乃ひとみ), who was featured in a Ridge Racer trailer shown in the 2002 edition of the E3 even as the Ridge Racer series does not belong to that line. However, since Reiko's popularity with fans still was strong, Namco decided to bring back her for 2004's Ridge Racers. This game features her revamped 3D model for the introductory animation, again done by Kei Yoshimizu, who would also provide the reference for some of Reiko's further appearances. Those included Ridge Racer 6 (2005, including a hidden in-game message from her), Ridge Racer 7 (2006, featuring a "slightly older" Reiko officially described as "the racing queen of your dreams"), Ridge Racers 2 (2006), Ridge Racer Accelerated (2006), Ridge Racer 3D (2011), and Ridge Racer Slipstream (2013).

Other appearances
Due to her popularity, she went to make many appearances in games outside of the Ridge Racer series, most of them featuring her in the white-and-red outfit from the R4: Ridge Racer Type 4 promotional artwork. She is a playable character in Anna Kournikova's Smash Court Tennis (1998), and appears as a baseball player in the Namco Stars (ナムコスターズ) sports team in three entries in the Super World Stadium series (1999–2001) and in Professional Baseball Famisuta 2011. She is also playable in Namco Wonder Classic (2001) and in Pac-Man Fever (2002). Reiko's costume is available in the role-playing video game Tales of Phantasia: Narikiri Dungeon (2000), a poster of Reiko has been made available in Sony's Mainichi Issho in 2007. The sports game Family Ski (2008) has her featured in many of the unlockable skis, and in the rhythm game Taiko no Tatsujin: V Version (2015) she is a summon character.

Reiko also appears on the covers of Ridge Racer soundtracks, including Ridge Racers Direct Audio (2005) and Ridge Racer 20th Anniversary Remix (2014). She is prominently featured in a Ridge Racer-themed pachislot, along with a PlayStation 2 port of that machine, and has also been featured in other products licensed by Namco, including the first and sixth wave of Namco Gals gashapon and other figurines and garage kits by various manufacturers. In 1999, she was featured in Namco's E3 PlayStation 2 pre-launch real-time technology demo program "Ridge Racer Girl". Promotional models dressed as Reiko have advertised for Namco at gaming industry events such as E3 and Nintendo World.

Kei Nagase
 is a name of several pilot characters featured in Namco's Ace Combat series of combat flight simulators. She serves as the series' "image girl" mascot and in all her incarnations is always bearing resemblance of Reiko Nagase. One of them, a selectable wingman in Ace Combat 2 (1997), was actually officially identified as Reiko's younger sister born in 1977. One Kei Nagase, callsign , is a major character in Ace Combat 5: The Unsung War (2004) and also appears in Ace Combat 7: Skies Unknown (2019). Another Nagase known also as "Edge" appears in Ace Combat Infinity (2014). "Project Nagase" was an official blog for Ace Combat: Assault Horizon (2011).

Reception
Reiko Nagase has been very well received by gamers and journalists alike. Japanese arcade magazine Gamest named her as the 20th best character of 1995 just for her cameo in Rave Racer and German magazine Mega Fun included Reiko in R4: Ridge Racer Type 4 among the five nominees for the title of "Videogame Babe 1999". Including the "stylish, sassy and supercool" Reiko among the top five "cyberbabes" (defined as female video game characters "who appeal to both boys and girls") in 1999, the Daily Mirror noted "she's become an icon" in Japan. Australian Station commented on "Reiko's wholesome sexiness and huge popularity, it's undeniable that she's a symbol identified with the original PlayStation". In 2014, Japanese magazine Dengeki PlayStation placed her among the 200 best characters in the 20-year history of the PlayStation brand.

Reiko has quickly achieved a great popularity and dedicated following, whose discontent Namco felt when Ai Fukami took her role in Ridge Racer V. According to Australian Station in 2000, "hordes of Reiko Nagase fans were up in arms over the decision to replace her, and even casual gamers have been heard to comment they 'liked the old one better'". Reiko was soon brought back to the series due to the upset fans' requests, including an "outraged" petition. New Zealand Station told how "Ridge Racer fans across the globe were in an uproar once news of this change came to light, with Reiko Vs Ai polls featuring prominently in many fansites on the internet". Official Australian PlayStation Magazine reported how one poll "has revealed 90 per cent of PlayStation owners prefer Reiko's flawless beauty to the new model". In another poll that same year, IGN's "readers overwhelmingly agreed that Reiko Nagase is the true Ridge Racer babe". Video game journalists also joined in, such as when Hyper rhetorically asked "how long it will be before they realise that the new Ridge Racer girl sucks, and bring back Reiko. 'Attention Namco: BRING BACK REIKO!!!!'" In a 2006 article discussing the "legend of Reiko Nagase", 1UP.com's James Mielke wrote she "is almost as popular as the games she graces" as after Ridge Racer V "the fans welcomed their favorite race queen back with open arms. Her return made everyone feel that the Ridge Racer world was once again whole".

In 2000, she was IGN editor Doug Perry's personal choice for the best "Babe of Videogames", as for how for him Reiko presented "just the opposite of Lara Croft. She's sexy, she's subtle, and she has a great smile", and Hypers Seamus Byrne also stated his preference of Reiko over Lara in 2006. Justin Towell of GamesRadar wrote Ridge Race has "got a real icon in the shape of its covergirl, Reiko Nagase", others such as Official UK PlayStation Magazine in 2001 and Kotaku Japan in 2015 too described her as an iconic character, and Joystiq's Andrew Yoon wrote the Ridge Racers series "is famous for the CG model Reiko Nagase posing seductively". Featuring the Ridge Racer series among the best arcade racers of all time, Wirtualna Polska noted the games in part "owe it to the character of the beautiful Reiko Nagase".

However, James Newman in his critical book Videogames wrote that "Ridge Racer Revolutions Reiko Nagase is a case in point [...] serving no purpose other than to appear in box art and wave the chequered flag at the start of the race, Reiko is the epitome of outmoded and unwelcome stereotyping" while discussing gender representation in video games and specifically female characters "relegated to the periphery or background" (in reality, Reiko does not even appear in Revolution and a different, unnamed race queen does, but only in-game and not on the cover art). On the other hand, the review of Ridge Racer Accelerated by IGN's Levi Buchanan specifically noted "the welcome appearance of Reiko Nagase in the opening movie and menu"; the review of Ridge Racer 64 by N64 Magazine (where she was also featured her on the issue's cover) praised this "virtual beauty" for how she "brings her unique brand of magic to the game's intro and title screens" through the series, and Destructoid's Chris Carter wrote in his review of Ridge Racer Slipstream that the inclusion of Reiko in this entry of the series "gives it a bit of authenticity right off the bat".

In a retrospective article about Ridge Racer Type 4, GamesRadar's Towell wrote "how many times did we watch that intro at the start of the game?" and 1UP.com's Mielke opined "this brief sequence remains one of the best opening cinemas in videogame history". Praising the "stunning appearance" of Reiko in the PlayStation 2 demo, whose detail was described by IGN as "phenomenal", PlayStation Power wrote it "really was the most realistic character animation we've seen on a console – as the wind caught her hair each individual strand moved too. We were speechless". IGN included "a CG intro starring the lovely Reiko Nagase" among the graphically "amazing" features of Ridge Racers 2, and Sean Hinz from ScrewAttack included Reiko among Namco characters "worthy" to guest-appear in Nintendo's Smash Bros. series of fighting games.

Kara Shindo, a street racing gang leader and the lead character of Ridge Racer Unbounded, was confused by some media outlets (such as Kotaku USA and Kotaku Japan) with Reiko Nagase when the game was announced, along with comments on the supposed radical changes to her character. Further confusing Ai from Ridge Racer V with Reiko, GamesRadar's Towell included her among the early "triumphs of realistic faces in video games" and also mentioned her in his article "why PS2 was the best console ever".

References

Action video game characters
Advertising characters

Female characters in video games
Female characters in advertising
Fictional baseball players
Fictional Japanese people in video games
Fictional models
Fictional tennis players
Namco characters
Video game characters introduced in 1996
Video game mascots